Douglas Mostyn Harris  (15 June 1919 – 17 June 1996) was a New Zealand runner who competed at the 1948 Olympics and the 1950 British Empire Games.

Harris won five New Zealand national athletics titles: the 440 yards in 1945, 1946, and 1947; and the 880 yards in 1946 and 1947.

Harris died on 17 June 1996, and he was buried at Hāwera Cemetery.

References

1919 births
1996 deaths
New Zealand male middle-distance runners
Athletes (track and field) at the 1948 Summer Olympics
Olympic athletes of New Zealand
Athletes (track and field) at the 1950 British Empire Games
Commonwealth Games competitors for New Zealand
Burials at Hawera Cemetery
20th-century New Zealand people